ANHS may refer to:

Aliso Niguel High School, Aliso Viejo, California
Antelope High School, Antelope, California
Appleton North High School, Appleton, Wisconsin